Brome-Missisquoi is a provincial electoral district in the Montérégie region of Quebec, Canada that elects members to the National Assembly of Quebec. It notably includes the municipalities of Cowansville, Bromont, Farnham, Shefford and Lac-Brome

It was created for the 1973 election from Brome and parts of Missisquoi and Shefford.

In the change from the 2001 to the 2011 electoral map, it lost Austin, Bolton-Est, Bonsecours, Eastman, Lawrenceville, Potton, Sainte-Anne-de-la-Rochelle, Saint-Benoît-du-Lac, Saint-Étienne-de-Bolton, Stukely-Sud to Orford electoral district, but gained  Shefford, Warden, Waterloo from Shefford electoral district.

Members of the National Assembly

Election results

References

External links
Information
 Elections Quebec

Election results
 Election results (National Assembly)

Maps
 2011 map (PDF)
 2001 map (Flash)
2001–2011 changes (Flash)
1992–2001 changes (Flash)
 Electoral map of Montérégie region
 Quebec electoral map, 2011

Quebec provincial electoral districts
Cowansville
Waterloo, Quebec
Brome-Missisquoi Regional County Municipality